Sarnia Photovoltaic Power Plant near Sarnia, Ontario, is Canada's largest photovoltaic plant with an installed capacity of 97 MWP (80 MWAC).

In 2009, Ontario introduced a feed-in tariff renewable energy payments program paying up to CDN 44.3 cents per kW·h for large ground arrays such as the Sarnia plant. This makes Ontario's one of the top feed in tariff programs in the world.

Phase I (for 20 MW) was completed in December 2009. Phase II (60 MW) was completed in September 2010 at a cost of C$300 million. The project was developed by Enbridge.

First Solar developed, engineered, and constructed the facility, and it will operate the Sarnia Solar Project for Enbridge under a long-term contract. Enbridge will sell the power output of the facility to the Ontario Power Authority pursuant to 20-year power purchase agreements under the terms of the Ontario government's Renewable Energy Standard Offer Program.

At the completion of Phase II it was the largest solar power station in the world, a title it held until the 2011 opening of Huanghe Hydropower Golmud Solar Park in China. The expected annual energy yield is about 120,000 MW·h, which if produced in a coal-fired plant, would require emission of 39,000 tonnes of CO2.

See also

List of solar farms in Canada

References

Solar power stations in Ontario
Buildings and structures in Sarnia
Energy infrastructure completed in 2009
2009 establishments in Ontario
Enbridge